Karol: The Pope, The Man is a 2006 TV miniseries directed by Giacomo Battiato chronicling Pope John Paul II's life as pope in flashbacks from the October 22, 1978 papal inauguration to his death in 2005. It is the sequel to the 2005 TV miniseries Karol: A Man Who Became Pope, which portrayed John Paul's life before the papacy and ended on October 16, 1978, the day of his papal election.

Main cast
Piotr Adamczyk as Pope John Paul II
Adriana Asti as Mother Teresa
Leslie Hope as Julia Ritter
Timothy Martin
Michele Placido
Alkis Zanis as Ali Ağca
Carlos Kaniowsky as Óscar Arnulfo Romero y Galdámez
Fabrice Scott as Jerzy Popiełuszko
Paolo Maria Scalondro as Wojciech Jaruzelski

External links
Website at CBC Television
Karol: The Pope, The Man at The Internet Movie Database

2006 films
English-language Canadian films
English-language Italian films
English-language Polish films
Films about Pope John Paul II
Films set in Kraków
Films shot in Kraków
2000s Canadian television miniseries
2000s Italian television miniseries
Polish television series
Films directed by Giacomo Battiato
Films scored by Ennio Morricone
Cultural depictions of Mother Teresa
Cultural depictions of Óscar Romero
Sequel television series